Stempfferia insulana is a butterfly in the family Lycaenidae. It is found in Cameroon, the Republic of the Congo, the Central African Republic, the Democratic Republic of the Congo, Uganda and north-western Tanzania.

References

Butterflies described in 1923
Poritiinae